St. Robert Catholic High School is a secondary school in Thornhill, Ontario, Canada.

History 

St. Robert CHS was opened by the York Catholic District School Board in 1975, and it celebrated its 40th anniversary in 2015. It is named after its patron saint, St. Robert Bellarmine.

The extension added in January 1989 completes the school as it stands today.

The school offers special programs such as the International Baccalaureate program, ESL, and Aviation Technology.

The enrolment averages between 1400 and 1600 students per school year.

Although the current school colours consist of forest green, white, and black, the initial school colours were orange, dark brown, and beige.

The uniform consists of black dress pants, white golf shirts monogrammed with the school's logo (which are offered in both long- and short-sleeved versions), green monogrammed sweatshirts, and solid black dress shoes.

International Baccalaureate Program 

The International Baccalaureate program at St. Robert consists of two stages. Every year, approximately 500 students in Grade 8 try out for the Pre-IB program, 180 of whom are accepted. Around 150 students accept the offer. For grades 9 and 10, students are enrolled in the Pre-IB program, taking courses above their grade level (such as grade 11 functions [MCR3U] during grade 10). For the final two years, students start the IB Diploma Program, choosing three standard-level courses (one of which is SL French) and three higher-level courses. Students also take a course called Theory of Knowledge (TOK), begin their Extended Essay, and begin the CAS (Creativity, Activity, Service) components of the IB Diploma. In the final year, students take their IB exams in May, which will test their two standard level courses and three higher-level courses. At the end of the program, around a hundred students graduate each year with an IB Diploma in addition to their OSSD Diploma.

School rankings 

St. Robert CHS is one of the top-ranking secondary schools in Ontario according to the Fraser Institute. For 2017, the school scored 9.2 (out of 10), ranking 18th out of 747 schools across Ontario in the Fraser Institute's Report Card on Ontario's Secondary Schools 2019.

Sports 

Students compete with other schools in the York Region Athletic Association in both Junior (Grades 9 and 10) and Senior (Grades 11 and 12) Divisions. As of 2014, the YRAA included 52 high schools across York Region, with most of its schools coming from either the York Catholic District School Board or the York Region District School Board, although there are several private schools involved as well.

Boys' teams:
 Badminton
 Hockey
 Basketball
 Volleyball
 Rugby
 Soccer
 Baseball

Girls' teams:
 Badminton
 Hockey
 Basketball
 Volleyball
 Slow-pitch
 Soccer
 Rugby

Coed:
 Badminton
 Skiing (Night Flyers Ski Club)
 Swimming
 Tennis
 Cross country
 Golf
 Track and field

Notable alumni 
Frank Dukes - record producer (Class of 2001)
Paul McGuire - TV host (Class of 1990)
Marco Bruno - record producer (Class of 1998)
Tanisha Scott - choreographer (Class of 1996)

See also
List of high schools in Ontario
International Baccalaureate
York Catholic District School Board

References

External links
Official website

York Catholic District School Board
High schools in the Regional Municipality of York
International Baccalaureate schools in Ontario
Educational institutions established in 1975
Catholic secondary schools in Ontario
1975 establishments in Ontario